Ralph Thomas (1915–2001) was an English film director.

Ralph Thomas may also refer to:
Ralph Thomas (American football) (born 1929), American football player
Ralph Thomas (Australian footballer) (born 1952), Australian footballer for Footscray
Ralph W. Thomas (1862–1920), New York politician
Ralph L. Thomas (born 1939), Canadian film director

See also